Jane Ash Poitras   LL. D.  D.Litt (born 1951) is a Cree painter and printmaker from Canada. Her work uses the idioms of mainstream art to express the experience of Aboriginal people in Canada.

Life
Jane Ash Poitras was born in Fort Chipewyan Alberta. Her mother died of tuberculosis when Poitras was six and she was adopted by an elderly German woman. She grew up in Edmonton, Alberta in a Catholic household. Before turning to a career in the arts, she obtained a B.Sc. in microbiology at the University of Alberta. She later obtained a Bachelor of Fine Arts degree in printmaking from the University of Alberta and a Master's from Columbia University.

Work

Poitras uses a vocabulary of layered images, readymades and text to explore the historical and personal experience of an aboriginal person in Canadian society. This approach to creating images was developed out of Dada by the American Abstract Expressionists and their associates; Mark Rothko, Kurt Schwitters, Robert Rauschenberg, and Cy Twombly. Poitras was exposed to this work during her studies at Columbia University.

Poitras extends the meaning of her paintings by applying objects holding symbolic significance to the surface of the compositions.  A Sacred Prayer for a Sacred Island, 1991 includes an eagle feather and a five dollar bill. An eagle feather is considered sacred by North American Aboriginal People; the five-dollar bill represents the treaty annuity paid by the Canadian government to aboriginal individuals.

The paintings Poitras creates can be very large. One of the pieces acquired by the Royal Ontario Museum in 2010 is a triptych 25 feet long by 9 feet high.  Potato Peeling 101 to Ethnobotany 101 (2004), portrays a narrative of the experience of preserving aboriginal cultural knowledge through the years of forced assimilation.

Poitras maintains an active exhibition schedule, having  participated in over 30 solo exhibitions and 60 group exhibitions before 2006. She is a long-standing sessional instructor with the University of Alberta and travels as a guest lecturer across North America.

Mentorship
Poitras has mentored young apprentice artists of Aboriginal background, including Linus Woods.

Selected Collections
National Gallery of Canada
Royal Ontario Museum
Canadian Museum of Civilization 
Brooklyn Museum 
Canada Council Art Bank 
Leonard and Bina Ellen Art Gallery, Concordia University 
McMichael Canadian Art Collection 
Royal Alberta Museum
Art Gallery of Ontario
Edmonton Art Gallery, now known as the Art Gallery of Alberta
Art Gallery of Nova Scotia
Vancouver Art Gallery
Winnipeg Art Gallery 
Glenbow-Alberta Institute, Glenbow Museum
The Robert McLaughlin Gallery
MacKenzie Art Gallery
Agnes Etherington Art Centre
Art Windsor Essex

Selected Honours

Order of Canada

Queen Elizabeth II Diamond Jubilee Medal

Honorary Doctor of Laws degree from University of Calgary

Honorary Doctor of Letters degree from University of Alberta
Royal Canadian Academy of Arts
Alberta Centennial Medal 
National Aboriginal Achievement Award for Arts and Culture, now the Indspire Awards, 2006 
University of Alberta Alumni Award of Excellence 
Lieutenant Governor of Alberta Distinguished Artist Award

Bibliography

Poitras, Jane A, and Rick Rivet. Osopikahikiwak. Paris: Services culturels de l'Ambassade du Canada, 1999. Print.

External links
Canadian Encyclopedia entry 
ARTSask -Jane Ash Poitras
Kinsman Robinson Galleries - Jane Ash Poitras, CM

References

1951 births
Living people
Artists from Alberta
Canadian women painters
First Nations painters
Members of the Order of Canada
Members of the Royal Canadian Academy of Arts
20th-century Canadian women artists
Indspire Awards
21st-century Canadian women artists
Canadian collage artists
First Nations women artists